Savona Bailey-McClain is an American community organizer and art producer, and the director of the West Harlem Art Fund. Bailey-McClain has curated or organized exhibitions by Vicki DaSilva, Bentley Meeker, Tomo Mori. She has also spoken at the Silicon Harlem Technology Conference, and organized part of the NYCxDESIGN festival. Outside of art, she is the head of West Harlem Food and Beverage, a merchants association in Harlem, and served as a member of New York's Community Board 9.

References 

Living people
Year of birth missing (living people)
American art curators
American women curators
21st-century American women